Ronald Alexander Jarden (born 14 December 1929, Lower Hutt, New Zealand and died 18 February 1977, Lower Hutt), better known as Ron Jarden, was a New Zealand rugby union footballer, businessman, and sharebroker.

Career

Rugby career
Jarden played club rugby for Victoria University in 1949, and was selected to play provincial rugby for Wellington (on the wing) that year. He practised daily at goal-kicking and also lineout throwing (which was performed by wingers in those days). He was selected for the North Island team in 1950 and then the All Blacks in 1951. He played 16 Tests and 21 other matches for the All Blacks before retiring in 1956 following the tour of the South African team.
He was voted New Zealand Sportsman of the year in 1951.

Business career
He had graduated from Victoria with a Bachelor of Arts in 1953, and his retirement from rugby in 1956 was to concentrate on his business career with Shell. He was very successful in business and eventually started his own stockbroking firm RA Jarden & Co, which is now Jarden Securities Limited, New Zealand's largest investment bank. He was appointed chairman of the Broadcasting Council which governed New Zealand's broadcasting system in 1975.

Jarden died on 18 February 1977 from a heart attack. In 2008, he was posthumously inducted into the New Zealand Business Hall of Fame.

References

External links

1929 births
1977 deaths
New Zealand rugby union players
Rugby union wings
Victoria University of Wellington alumni
Rugby union players from Lower Hutt
New Zealand international rugby union players
People educated at Hutt Valley High School